Flying Out is an album led by bassist Cecil McBee recorded in 1982 and first released on the India Navigation label.

Reception

In his review for AllMusic, Scott Yanow stated that "the advanced music and the blending of the unusual colors works quite well".

Track listing
All compositions by Cecil McBee
 "First Impression" - 8:54
 "Truth - A Path to Peace" - 7:19
 "Into a Fantasy" - 6:45
 "Flying Out" - 7:12
 "Blues on the Bottom - 5:41

Personnel
Cecil McBee - double bass, piano
Olu Dara - cornet
John Blake - violin
David Eyges - cello
Billy Hart - drums

References

 

1982 albums
Cecil McBee albums
India Navigation albums